Jim Carone (born April 13, 1981) is an American baseball coach, who is the  current head baseball coach of the McDaniel Green Terror. He played college baseball at Monmouth. He has also been the head coach of the Wagner Seahawks (2012–2021).

Carone played at Monmouth University, registering among the nation's best in ERA in his junior season.  He earned Northeast Conference Pitcher of the Year honors for his efforts that season, setting a program record for wins in a season with 10.

After ending his playing career, Carone served single seasons as an assistant coach at then-Division II NJIT, Division III Stevens Tech, and Wagner.  He then served two seasons at Rider before three seasons as pitching coach at Villanova.  He was hired as head coach at Wagner on January 30, 2012.

On May 24, 2021, Carone announced his resignation from Wagner.

Head coaching record

References

External links
Jim Carone, Head Baseball Coach, Wagner College Seahawks

Living people
1981 births
Baseball pitchers
Monmouth Hawks baseball players
NJIT Highlanders baseball coaches
People from Point Pleasant Beach, New Jersey
Rider Broncs baseball coaches
Sportspeople from Ocean County, New Jersey
Stevens Tech Ducks baseball coaches
Villanova Wildcats baseball coaches
Wagner Seahawks baseball coaches